Yu Haiyan (born July 1961) is a former Chinese official. At the height of his career, he served as the Vice Governor of Gansu and Communist Party Secretary of Lanzhou. On January 11, 2017, Yu was placed under investigation by the Communist Party's anti-corruption agency. He was the second high-ranking politician being examined from Gansu province after the 18th Party Congress in 2012.

Career
Yu Haiyan was born in Yiwu, Zhejiang. He joined Chinese Communist Party in 1987. Before his political career, he worked for Jiuquan Steel. In 1996, Lu went to Tianshui to become the Communist Party Secretary there. In 2011, Yu Haiyan became the Vice Governor of Gansu. In 2012, he became the Communist Party Secretary of Lanzhou. In 2016, he appointed as the Vice Governor of Gansu again.

On January 11, 2017, Yu Haiyan was placed under investigation by the Central Commission for Discipline Inspection of the Chinese Communist Party for "serious violations of laws and regulations". He was the second consecutive serving Lanzhou party chief to fall under the axe of the anti-corruption campaign, after Lu Wucheng, his immediate predecessor. He was expelled from the party on June 4, 2017.

On July 18, 2018, Yu was sentenced to 15 years in prison and fined six million yuan for taking bribes worth 65.63 million yuan by the Chongqing First Intermediate People's Court.

References

1961 births
People from Yiwu
Living people
Political office-holders in Gansu
Chinese Communist Party politicians from Zhejiang
People's Republic of China politicians from Zhejiang
Expelled members of the Chinese Communist Party
Politicians from Jinhua